Kochetki is a rural locality (a settlement) in Ilkinskoye Rural Settlement, Melenkovsky District, Vladimir Oblast, Russia. The population was 1 as of 2010. There is 1 street.

Geography 
Kochetki is located 49 km southwest of Melenki (the district's administrative centre) by road. Dmitriyevo is the nearest rural locality.

References 

Rural localities in Melenkovsky District